A flow control valve regulates the flow or pressure of a fluid. Control valves normally respond to signals generated by independent devices such as flow meters or temperature gauges.

Operation

Control valves are normally fitted with actuators and positioners. Pneumatically-actuated globe valves and diaphragm valves are widely used for control purposes in many industries, although quarter-turn types such as (modified)  ball and butterfly valves are also used.

Control valves can also work with hydraulic actuators (also known as hydraulic pilots). These types of valves are also known as automatic control valves. The hydraulic actuators respond to changes of pressure or flow and will open/close the valve. Automatic control valves do not require an external power source, meaning that the fluid pressure is enough to open and close them.  

Automatic control valves include pressure reducing valves, flow control valves, back-pressure sustaining valves, altitude valves, and relief valves.

Application
Process plants consist of hundreds, or even thousands, of control loops all networked together to produce a product to be offered for sale. Each of these control loops is designed to keep some important process variable, such as pressure, flow, level, or temperature, within a required operating range to ensure the quality of the end product. Each loop receives and internally creates disturbances that detrimentally affect the process variable, and interaction from other loops in the network provides disturbances that influence the process variable.

To reduce the effect of these load disturbances, sensors and transmitters collect information about the process variable and its relationship to some desired set point. A controller then processes this information and decides what must be done to get the process variable back to where it should be after a load disturbance occurs. When all the measuring, comparing, and calculating are done, some type of final control element must implement the strategy selected by the controller. The most common final control element in the process control industries is the control valve. The control valve manipulates a flowing fluid, such as gas, steam, water, or chemical compounds, to compensate for the load disturbance and keep the regulated process variable as close as possible to the desired set point.

Images

See also 

 Ball valve
 Butterfly valve
 Check valve
 Control valve
 Diaphragm valve
 Flow limiter
 Flow measurement
 Gate valve
 Globe valve
 Mass flow controller
 Needle valve
 Plastic pressure pipe systems
 Thermal mass flow meter

References

Valves